Kiselnoye is a rural locality (a selo) in Kiselinskoye Rural Settlement, Ternovsky District, Voronezh Oblast, Russia. The population was 327 as of 2010. There are 2 streets.

Geography 
Kiselnoye is located 50 km southwest of Ternovka (the district's administrative centre) by road. Dubrovka is the nearest rural locality.

References 

Rural localities in Ternovsky District